The Cork Athletic Union League, also known as the Cork AUL, is an association football league featuring amateur and junior clubs from County Cork. Its top division, the Premier League, is a seventh level division in the Republic of Ireland football league system. The Cork AUL is currently sponsored by Murphy's Irish Stout. It is affiliated to the Munster Football Association. Clubs in the Cork AUL also compete in the FAI Junior Cup. Three League of Ireland clubs – Cobh Ramblers, Cork Hibernians and Albert Rovers – were originally members of the Cork AUL.

History

Inaugural season
The Cork Athletic Union Football League, originally known as the Cork City and County Athletic Union Junior League, was founded in 1947. Its founding members included two future members of the League of Ireland, Cobh Ramblers and Albert Rovers and the inaugural champions, Mortonville. The other eleven original members were Maymount Rovers, Prospect Rovers, Grattan, Ballinllough, Clapton Celtic, Green Rovers, Blackrock, Mountview, Marine Services, Cork Spinning and Ladyswell Brewery.

Munster Senior League
In addition to Cobh Ramblers, Cork Hibernians and Albert Rovers joining the League of Ireland, a number of current Munster Senior League clubs were also originally members of the Cork AUL before switching from junior to intermediate football. Five of the Cork AUL's most successful clubs – Temple United, Kinsale, St. Mary's, Wembley and Castleview – all subsequently joined the MSL. Other clubs to switch from the Cork AUL to the MSL include Avondale United, Mallow United, Tramore Athletic, College Corinthians, Ringmahon Rangers, Everton and Rockmount.

Cup competitions
In its inaugural season, 1947–48 the Cork AUL featured three league cup competitions, the City Challenge Cup, the Saxone Cup and the Miniature Cup. The Cork AUL's main league cup is the AOH Cup which was presented to the league in 1951 by the Ancient Order of Hibernians. Clubs in the Cork AUL also compete in the FAI Junior Cup. In 1973–74 St. Michael's of Tipperary won the competition while playing in the Cork AUL. Six other Cork AUL clubs – Castleview, Blackrock, Douglas, Everton, St. Mary's and Temple United – have all been finalists. Between 1961–62 and 1965–66 Cork AUL clubs were runners-up in four out of five seasons.

Representative team
The senior Cork AUL representative team competes in the Oscar Traynor Trophy against other representative teams of similar junior leagues. They have won the competition on two occasions, in 1965–66 and again in 2008–09. They were also runners-up in 1994–95.

FAI Oscar Traynor Trophy

Sponsors
The main sponsors of the Cork AUL are Murphy's Irish Stout. Other sponsors include the Evening Echo.

2015–16 clubs

List of winners by season

List of winners by club

References 

 
Association football in County Cork
7
Association football leagues in Munster
Sports leagues established in 1947
1947 establishments in Ireland
Association football in Cork (city)